Evert Viktor Lundquist (27 February 1900 – 19 February 1979) was a Swedish association football player who won a bronze medal at the 1924 Summer Olympics. In 1924–27 he played nine international matches and scored one goal. He later worked as a security guard at the amusement park Liseberg in Göteborg.

References

1900 births
1979 deaths
Swedish footballers
Footballers at the 1924 Summer Olympics
Olympic footballers of Sweden
Olympic bronze medalists for Sweden
Sweden international footballers
Olympic medalists in football
Medalists at the 1924 Summer Olympics
Association football forwards
Örgryte IS players
Footballers from Gothenburg